is a train station on the Kyoto Municipal Subway Tōzai Line in Higashiyama-ku, city of Kyoto, Kyoto Prefecture, Japan.

Layout
The subway station has an island platform serving two tracks separated by platform screen doors.

Surroundings
North of Sanjō-dōri
 Heian Shrine
 Okazaki Park
 The National Museum of Modern Art, Kyoto
 Kyoto Municipal Museum of Art
 Kyoto Prefectural Library
 Kyoto Kaikan
 Kyoto Industrial Promotion Center (Miyako messe)
Hosomi Museum

South of Sanjō-dōri
 Shōren-in
 Chion-in
 Maruyama Park
 Yasaka Shrine
 Gion
Kōdai-ji

References

Railway stations in Japan opened in 1997
Railway stations in Kyoto Prefecture